African Leadership in Vaccinology Expertise (ALIVE), is a South African Department of Science and Technology/National Research Foundation Flagship Initiative at the University of Witwatersrand, Johannesburg, established in 2016. It was co-founded by professor of vaccinology Shabir Madhi and runs an 18-month Master of Science in Medicine in the field of Vaccinology. Its members have been contributing to COVID-19 vaccine trials in South Africa during the COVID-19 pandemic.

References

Medical and health organisations based in South Africa